Landing on water could be:

 Water landing, any landing on water, also a euphemism for crash-landing into water in an aircraft
 Landing on Water, an album by Neil Young released in 1986